Deamia montalvoae is a species of flowering plant in the family Cactaceae, native to southeastern Mexico, Guatemala and El Salvador. It was first described in 2018. It climbs or hangs from trees or rocks, and has large funnel-shaped flowers, mostly white, and pale red fruit, covered with bristles and hairs.

Description
Deamia montalvoae either climbs or is partially supported by rocks or trees, with roots along its length which do not strongly cling to its supports. In addition to spines, the areoles have many bristles. The white pulp of the fruit is fragrant and sweet.

Taxonomy
Between 2008 and 2015, plants recorded as Deamia chontalensis, Selenicereus grandiflorus and Deamia aff. chontalensis were discovered in Guatemala, Mexico and El Salvador respectively. All three populations shared similar characteristics, but seemed to differ from known species in some respects, such as having much longer flowers than expected for D. chontalensis. In 2018, a study was published which used both molecular phylogenetic and morphological approaches to show that the plants were a new species of Deamia, which the authors of the study named Deamia montalvoae. The specific epithet honours Edy Albertina Montalvo, a pioneering El Salvadorian woman botanist.

Distribution and habitat
Deamia montalvoae occurs in three known and isolated populations: Chiapas in the Sierra Madre del Sur mountains in Mexico, Huehuetenango in Guatemala, and Santa Ana in El Salvador. It climbs on various kinds of tree, including Sideroxylon  tepicense and Ficus species.

Conservation
Although the species had not been assessed by the IUCN , its occurrence in three isolated populations in an area smaller than  led the original describers of the species to describe it as "endangered".

References

Echinocereeae
Flora of El Salvador
Flora of Guatemala
Flora of Southeastern Mexico
Plants described in 2018